The Embassy of France in Kyiv is the diplomatic mission of France in Ukraine.

History 

France recognised the independence of Ukraine on December 27, 1991.  Diplomatic relations were established on January 24, 1992. During the 2022 Russian Invasion of Ukraine, the embassy was relocated to Lviv on 28 February 2022 and returned to Kyiv on 15 April 2022.

List of Ambassadors
 1992 - 1993 Hugues Pernet
 1993 - 1995 Michel Peissik
 1995 - 1997 Dominique Chassard
 1997 - 2001 Pascal Fieschi
 2002 - 2005 Philippe de Suremain
 2005 - 2008 Jean-Paul Véziant
 2008 - 2011 Jacques Faure
 2011 - 2015 Alain Rémy
 2015 - 2019 Isabelle Dumont
 2019 - present Etienne de Poncins

See also 
 France–Ukraine relations
 Foreign relations of France
 Foreign relations of Ukraine
 Embassy of Ukraine, Paris
 Diplomatic missions in Ukraine

References

External links 
 
  Embassy of France, Kyiv
  French Ministry of Foreign Affairs
 Посольство Франції в Україні 

France
Kyiv
France–Ukraine relations